Jim or Jimmy Dawson may refer to:

Jim Dawson (born 1944), American author who specializes in pop culture
Jimmy Dawson (basketball, born 1945), American basketball player for the ABA's Indiana Pacers in the 1960s

See also
Jamie Dawson (1922–2009), commonly mistaken as "Jim" or "Jimmy" Dawson, an American basketball player for the NBL's Sheboygan Red Skins in the 1940s
James Dawson (disambiguation)